Kilelema is an administrative ward in Buhigwe District  of Kigoma Region of Tanzania. In 2016 the Tanzania National Bureau of Statistics report there were 17,086 people in the ward, from 15,523 in 2012.

Villages / neighborhoods 
The ward has 2 villages and 7 hamlets.

 Kilelema 
 Kidyama
 Nyamori
 Minazi
 Migongo 
 Legezamwendo
 Makungu
 Songambele
 Luyange

References

Buhigwe District
Wards of Kigoma Region